The Siam (also Siyamopali and Siyam) Nikaya is a monastic order within Sri Lankan Buddhism, founded by Upali Thera and located predominantly around the city of Kandy. It is so named because it originated within Thailand (formerly known in Sri Lanka as "Siyam Deshaya" and Europe as the "Kingdom of Siam"). The Siyam Nikaya has two major divisions (Malwatta and Asgiriya) and five other divisions within these two major units. The Malwatta and Asgiriya chapters have two separate Maha Nayakas or chief Monks.

History 
On the initiative of Ven. Weliwita Saranankara (1698–1778) the Thai monk Upali visited the Kingdom of Kandy in 1753 during the reign of Kirti Sri Rajasinha of Kandy (1747–1782), and there performed upasampada for a group of Kandyans. The Buddhist monastic order had become extinct thrice during the preceding five hundred years and was reestablished in the reigns of Vimala Dharma Suriya I (1591–1604) and Vimala Dharma Suriya II (1687–1707) as well. These reestablishments were short lived.

Although hagiographies written within Sri Lanka avoid the issue, the foundation of the Siam Nikaya was closely linked to both the aristocratic and caste politics of its era, including an attempted coup d'état that is unusually well-documented, due to the interaction of the colonial Dutch and the king of Kandy at the time:

Venerable Upali Thero
Upali Thera believed the Buddhist Sangha in Kandy was suffering from a state of corruption, which included the practice of astrology and his efforts were aimed at "purifying" the practices of the monastic order. It was also through the efforts of Upali Thera that the Kandy Esala Perahera was reorganized in its present form. Annually in Kandy there is a celebration which includes a parade in which the focus is the relic of the tooth of the Buddha. This procession was originally focused on honor to Hindu deities, particularly those incorporated into Sri Lankan Buddhism. Upali Thera believed this to be inappropriate in a Buddhist nation, and his influence led to the king declaring that "Henceforth Gods and men are to follow the Buddha".

The number of Siyam Nikaya monasteries and monks 
(Estimates from Ministry of Buddha Sasana, Sri Lanka)

Religious power

By the mid-18th century, upasampada (higher ordination, as distinct from samanera or novice ordination) had become extinct in Sri Lanka again. The Buddhist order had become extinct thrice during the preceding five hundred years and was re-established in the reigns of Vimala Dharma Suriya I (1591–1604) and Vimala Dharma Suriya II (1687–1707) as well. These re-establishments were short lived. On the initiative of Weliwita Sri Saranankara Thero (1698–1778) the Thai monk Upali Thera visited Kandy during the reign of king Kirti Sri Rajasinghe (1747–1782) and once again reestablished the Buddhist order in Sri Lanka in 1753. It was called the Siyam Nikaya after the "Kingdom of Siam".
 
However, in 1764, merely a decade after the re-establishment of the Buddhist order in Sri Lanka by reverend Upali, a group within the newly created Siyam Nikaya conspired and succeeded in restricting the Nikaya's higher ordination only to the Radala and Goigama caste, Sitinamaluwe Dhammajoti (Durawa) being the last non-Govigama monk receive his upasampada. This was a period when Buddhist Vinaya rules had been virtually abandoned and some members of the Buddhist Sangha in the Kandyan Kingdom privately held land, had wives and children, resided in the private homes and were called Ganinnanses. It was a period when the traditional nobility of the Kandyan Kingdom was decimated by continuous wars with the Dutch rulers of the Maritime Provinces. In the maritime provinces too a new order was replacing the old. Mandarampura Puvata, a text from the Kandyan period, narrates the above radical changes to the monastic order and shows that it was not a unanimous decision by the body of the sangha. It says that thirty-two ‘senior’ members of the Sangha who opposed this change were banished to Jaffna by the leaders of the reform.
 
The Govigama exclusivity of the Sangha thus secured in 1764 was almost immediately challenged by other castes who without the patronage of the King of Kandy or of the British, held their own upasampada ceremony at Totagamuwa Vihara in 1772. Another was held at Tangalle in 1798. Neither of these ceremonies were approved by the Siam Nikaya which claimed that these were not in accordance with the Vinaya rules.

The principal places of Buddhist worship in Sri Lanka including the Temple of the Tooth Relic, Adam's Peak, Kelaniya and over 6,000 other temples are now under the administration of the Siyam Nikaya.
From time immemorial the sacred Tooth Relic of Gautama Buddha has been considered the symbol of the rulers of Sri Lanka. As time went on, the seat of the kingdom was moved from Anuradhapura to Polonnaruwa, then to Dambadeniya and other cities. Upon each change of capital, a new palace was built to enshrine the Relic. Finally, it was brought to Kandy where it is at present, in the Temple of the Tooth. The oldest Buddhist sect in Sri Lanka, the Siam Nikaya (estd. 19 July 1753) are the custodians of the Tooth Relic, since its establishment during the Kandyan Kingdom. The Siyam Nikaya traditionally grants Higher ordination only to the Radala and Govigama castes, Sitinamaluwe Dhammajoti (Durawa) being the last non-Govigama monk receive upasampada. This conspiracy festered within the Siyam nikaya itself and Moratota Dhammakkandha, Mahanayaka of Kandy, with the help of the last two Kandyan Telugu Kings victimized the low country Mahanayaka Karatota Dhammaranma by confiscating the Sri Pada shrine and the retinue villages from the low country fraternity and appointing a rival Mahanayaka (Presently, an exception is the Rangiri Dambula sect which welcomes all communities while being a Siyam nikaya subsect).

References

External links
250 year celebrations
Buddhist Monks and Politics in Sri Lanka

Theravada Buddhist orders
Schools of Buddhism founded in Sri Lanka
Schools of Buddhism founded in Thailand